Carel le Roux (born 31 August 1972) is a retired South African shot putter.

He won the gold medal at the 1993 African Championships finished fourth at the 1994 Commonwealth Games and fifteenth at the 1995 World Indoor Championships.

His personal best put was 19.11 metres, achieved in February 1995 in Pretoria.

References

1972 births
Living people
South African male shot putters
Commonwealth Games competitors for South Africa
Athletes (track and field) at the 1994 Commonwealth Games